WAOS (1600 kHz "La Mejor") is a Spanish language commercial, AM radio radio station licensed to Austell, Georgia, and serving the Atlanta radio market.  The station airs a Regional Mexican radio format.  Programming is also simulcast on 1130 AM WLBA in Gainesville and on 1460 AM WXEM in Buford.  The stations are owned by La Favorita, Inc.

WAOS is considered a Class D AM station by the Federal Communications Commission.  By day, it is powered at 20,000 watts.  But to protect other stations on AM 1600, it greatly reduces power at night to 67 watts.  It uses a non-directional antenna located on Westside Road in Austell, near C. H. James Parkway (U.S. Route 278).

WLBA is also a Class D station, and is a daytimer.  It uses a non-directional antenna powered at 10,000 watts by day, 1,000 watts during critical hours but must sign off the air at night to protect other stations on AM 1130, a clear channel frequency.  WLBA's transmitter is off Gaines Mill Road in Gainesville.

WAOS began broadcasting on April 16, 1968.  WLBA first signed on the air on January 26, 1957.

References

External links
Official Radio "La Favorita" Website

AOS
Radio stations established in 1975
AOS